Robert Zemichiel (born 1 August 1977), known professionally as Afrob, is a German rapper and actor.

Biography 
Afrob was born in Venice, Italy to Eritrean parents but moved to Germany at a young age. He grew up in the German city of Stuttgart, which is where he started his rap career. In 1994, Afrob began his rap career as a featured artist for befriended rap crews such as the Massiven Töne, Freundeskreis (FK), and the Spezializtz. Afrob's also gained early fame from his collaboration with Stuttgart Posses such as "Die Kolchose" and "FK Allstars" (et al. with Max Herre, Joy Denalane, Gentleman, and Sékou).

It was not until 1999 that he released his first solo album, Rolle mit Hip Hop. Rolle mit Hip Hop was distributed by Four Music and featured collaborations with the Kolchose, and the album peaked at spot 13 on the German album charts. The same year, Afrob released the single "Reimemonster" ("rhyme monsters") which featured Hamburg City rapper Ferris MC. For this single, Afrob worked together primarily with musicians from Stuttgart (e.g. Wasi, DJ Friction, and Max Herre). Today, "Reimemonster" is still widely regarded as a German hip hop classic. In May 1999, Afrob arranged a tour with Freundeskreis, and in the fall of 1999, he toured with the Fantastischen Vier throughout Germany. At the end of 1999, together with Flavor Flav from Public Enemy and MC Rene, he rapped the song "1, 2, 3, ... Rhymes Galore" on the single by DJ Tomekk and Grandmaster Flash, which placed sixth in the German charts. 

His second album, Made in Germany, was released in 2001 by Four Music. The album was less successful, despite featuring acts like Gentleman, Wasi from Massive Töne, Max Herre, and Joy Denalane, and it peaked at spot 79 on the German album charts. This album was more pensive than the first, however, and was interesting due to its social criticism, epitomized by the release of the anti-racist single "Öffne die Augen" ("Open Your Eyes") with Frankfurt's D-Flame. Afrob's engagement with German racism continued with his participation in the Brothers Keepers project, collaborating with an all-star cast of Afro-German musicians in the single "Adriano".

The Brothers Keepers project also marked the first collaboration with Samy Deluxe. They met again when they worked on the single "Four Fists". They subsequently formed a group called ASD (Afrob und Samy Deluxe) and recorded an entire album together. The product of this cooperation was called Wer hätte das gedacht? ("Who Would Have Thought?"), which hit the stores in 2003. Today, Wer hätte das gedacht? remains Afrob's most successful album, having reached fifth place in the German charts.

After the success of ASD, Afrob released his third solo album in 2005. The album, named Hammer, was produced by the American producers Needlz, Waajeed, and B.R. Gunna and released on 28 February 2005 by Four Music. The Album was not as successful as Wer hätte das gedacht?, and it peaked at number 38 of the German charts. 

In 2006, Afrob collaborated in the solo album of the German rapper Lisi, Eine wie keine ("One of a Kind"). In the following year of 2007, Afrob made his acting debut in the comedy Leroy. Later, he appeared in the 2009 gangster film Kopf oder Zahl.

In 2008, Afrob and rapper Brixx produced the title song for the RTL-Series Alarm für Cobra 11 – Die Autobahnpolizei. In the same year, Afrob left the label Four Music and founded his own label named "G-Lette Music". Lastly, Afrob began work on his album Der Letzte seiner Art in 2008, which was finally released in the September 2009. Der Letzte seiner Art reached a peak at spot 70 on the German alum charts.

After a four year creative break, Afrob appeared in the German rapper Sido's 2013 song, 30-11-80. Next, Afrob's fifth solo album Push debuted on 30 May 2014. Push came as a bigger success compared to Afrob's previous albums, Hammer and Der Letzte seiner Art. Push peaked at spot 20 of the German album charts.

On 3 July 2015, Afrob and Samy Deluxe released their second ASD album Blockbasta, which peaked at number five on the German album charts. On 23 September 2016 Afrob released his sixth solo album Mutterschiff, and in 2017, he released his seventh solo album Beats, Rhymes & Mr. Scardanelli.

His most recent and potentially final album Abschied von Gestern (Goodbye to Yesterday) was released in 2019. In this album, Afrob discusses topics such as his relationship with rap and the hip hop community. Furthermore, the song "Flüchtling4Life" ("Refugee4Life") addresses the xenophobia and racism Afrob has experienced in Germany.

Afrob is active on social media, maintaining a Facebook page, Instagram account, and a Twitter account among other forms of social media. On 21 April 2020, Afrob streamed a showcase on Facebook Live with DJ Derezon to raise donations for Stuttgart artists who were impacted by the COVID-19 pandemic.

Afrob is a long-time fan of football club VfB Stuttgart.

Discography

Albums 
 1999: Rolle mit Hip Hop
 2001: Made in Germany
 2003: Wer hätte das gedacht? (with Samy Deluxe as ASD)
 2005: Hammer
 2009: Der Letzte seiner Art
 2014: Push
 2015: Blockbasta (with Samy Deluxe as ASD)
 2016: Mutterschiff
 2019: Abschied von Gestern

Singles 
 1999: "Reimemonster" (featuring Ferris MC)
 1999: "Einfach" (featuring Meli)
 2000: "Get Up" (DJ Thomilla featuring Afrob)
 2001: "Made in Germany"
 2001: "Öffne die Augen" (featuring D-Flame)
 2003: "Sneak Preview" (with Samy Deluxe as ASD)
 2003: "From Street to the Crowd" (featuring Street-Igor-X)
 2003: "Sag mir wo die Party ist!" (with Samy Deluxe as ASD)
 2003: "Hey du (Nimm dir Zeit)" (with Samy Deluxe as ASD)
 2005: "Wollt ihr wissen..."
 2005: "Es geht hoch" (featuring Lisi)
 2005: "Zähl mein Geld"
 2006: "Müde" (featuring Lisi)
 2007: "Flashback" (featuring Emory)
 2009: "Wo sind die Rapper hin?"
 2009: "Was wollt ihr?"
 2014: "Immer weiter"
 2014: "Afrob kommt"
 2014: "Abriss" (feat. Megaloh)
 2014: "R.I.P." (feat. Megaloh)
 2016: "Ich bin dieser"

Filmography 
 2007: Leroy
 2009: Kopf oder Zahl

References

External links 

Afrob on IMDb

1977 births
Italian emigrants to Germany
German people of Eritrean descent
German rappers
Living people
Musicians from Stuttgart
Actors from Stuttgart